RNLB Mary Stanford may refer to:

 RNLB Mary Stanford (ON 661), based at Rye Harbour, Sussex, 1916 - 1028
 RNLB Mary Stanford (ON 733), based at Ballycotton, County Cork, 1930 - 1959